Norwegian Insurance Council was a supervisory authority for the insurance industry in Norway.

It was created following the Insurance Companies Act of 29 July 1911, replacing a committee named . From 1958 it also supervised pension funds.

In 1986 it was merged with the Bank Inspection Agency and the Broker Control Agency to form the Financial Supervisory Authority of Norway.

References

Defunct government agencies of Norway
Norway
Government agencies established in 1911
1911 establishments in Norway
1986 disestablishments in Norway
Insurance regulation
Regulation in Norway